Arthur Raymond Randolph (born November 1, 1943) is a Senior United States circuit judge of the United States Court of Appeals for the District of Columbia Circuit. He was appointed to the Court in 1990 and assumed senior status on November 1, 2008.

Education and career
Randolph was born in Riverside Township, New Jersey, and grew up in two communities in New Jersey, Palmyra and the Glendora section of Gloucester Township. He graduated from Triton Regional High School in 1961, as part of the school's first graduating class.

Randolph earned a Bachelor of Science degree from Drexel University in 1966, majoring in economics and basic engineering. At Drexel, he was president of the debate society, vice president of the Student Senate, and a member of the varsity wrestling squad. He then attended the University of Pennsylvania Law School. He served as managing editor of the University of Pennsylvania Law Review, and graduated in 1969 ranked first in his class with a Juris Doctor summa cum laude.

Randolph then clerked for 2nd Circuit Judge Henry Friendly from 1969 to 1970, then began a career in law in Washington, D.C., moving between private practice, government, and academia.

He started as the Assistant to the United States Solicitor General for three years, went into private practice briefly, and returned as the Deputy U.S. Solicitor General from 1975 to 1977. He also taught at Georgetown University Law Center from 1974 to 1978. In 1979, Randolph was appointed Special Counsel to the Committee on Standards of Official Conduct (the Ethics Committee) of the United States House of Representatives, remaining in this position until 1980. He then stayed in private practice, becoming a partner at Pepper, Hamilton & Scheetz, until he moved to the bench in 1990. He held a number of positions while in private practice, including Special Assistant Attorney General for the states of New Mexico (1985–90), Utah (1986–1990) and Montana (1983–1990). He also served as a Member of the Advisory Panel of the Federal Courts Study Committee. From 1971 to 1990, Randolph argued 23 times in the United States Supreme Court.

Federal judicial service
Randolph was nominated by President George H. W. Bush on May 8, 1990, to a seat on the United States Court of Appeals for the District of Columbia Circuit vacated by Judge Spottswood William Robinson III. He was confirmed by the United States Senate on July 13, 1990, and received commission on July 16, 1990. He assumed senior status on November 1, 2008.

From 1993 through 1995 Judge Randolph was a member of the Committee on Codes of Conduct of the Judicial Conference of the United States, and from 1995 to 1998 served as the Committee's chairman.

On July 3, 2019, after District Judge Emmet G. Sullivan received a message regarding a July 12, 2019 event co-sponsored by judiciary branch's research and education agency, he forwarded the email to about 45 judges and their staffs to alert them to an upcoming climate-change seminar. His note said only, "just FYI." Within an hour, Randolph replied via a "Reply all," response to Sullivan and all those who had been copied on the forwarded email. He questioned Sullivan's ethics and recommended he get "back into the business of judging, which are (sic) what you are being paid to do. As a former chairman of the federal judiciary's ethics committee, I think you have crossed the line. Should I report you? I don’t know?"  Characterizing Sullivan's first message as having subjected, "...our colleagues to this nonsense," Randolph suggested he had breached judicial decorum: "The jurisdiction assigned to you does not include saving the planet. A little hubris (sic) would be welcomed in many of your latest public displays. The supposedly (sic) science and stuff you are now sponsoring is nothing of the sort." Sullivan responded to Randolph and all who had been copied: "I sincerely regret that you were offended by my email! I merely forwarded an email announcing a seminar sponsored in conjunction with the support of the Federal Judicial Center. I have no stake in that seminar." Two other judges defended Sullivan to those copied on the exchange. One wrote to explain the purpose of the Center's presentation and noting that Chief Justice John G. Roberts Jr. chaired a board which had approved of the event. The second characterized Randolph's outburst as "accusatory," and "quite disturbing."

Notable cases
In 2006, Judge Randolph found that a rule by Security and Exchange Commission requiring hedge funds to consider natural persons as clients was arbitrary and capricious. In June 2017, Randolph partially dissented when the court found that the Foreign Sovereign Immunities Act did not prevent the survivors of a Holocaust victim from suing to recover art stolen by Nazi plunderers.

Guantanamo Bay
Al Odah v. United States was the first appeal before the D.C. Circuit challenging the Bush Administration's policies regarding detention of suspected terrorists at Guantanamo Bay.  In Al Odah, Judge Randolph wrote for a unanimous panel that the detainees at Guantanamo Bay did not have rights under the United States Constitution.  That decision was reversed by the Supreme Court in Rasul v. Bush.  The United States Congress subsequently passed the Detainee Treatment Act, which was intended to reverse the effect of the Supreme Court's decision in Rasul.

Judge Randolph also wrote the majority opinion for the D.C. Circuit in Hamdan v. Rumsfeld.  Hamdan involved a challenge to the Bush Administration's military commissions to try designated "enemy combatants" at Guantanamo Bay.  Judge Randolph held for a unanimous court that the Administration had authority to conduct the commissions and that they were not in violation of the Geneva Conventions.  Judge Stephen Williams concurred in the judgment, disagreeing on the latter point.  The Supreme Court reversed the D.C. Circuit in Hamdan v. Rumsfeld.  Again, the United States Congress passed legislation, this time the Military Commissions Act of 2006, to reverse the effect of the Supreme Court's ruling.

Rasul v. Bush became Boumediene v. Bush when it came again before the D.C. Circuit.  Judge Randolph again wrote the majority opinion.  In Boumediene the court upheld the Military Commissions Act, which stripped the federal courts of jurisdiction to hear petitions of habeas corpus from aliens detained by the US Military.  This time Judge Judith Rogers dissented.  The petitioners in Boumediene asked the Supreme Court to reverse Judge Randolph's opinion. The Court denied their petition, but, in an unusual move, later reversed itself and granted certiorari, then reversed.

In March 2017, Randolph argued that the public has no First Amendment right to access prisoners' court filings when the court, unanimous in judgment but in divided opinions, found that the press could not access classified video of Jihad Ahmed Mustafa Dhiab being force fed during the Guantanamo Bay hunger strikes.

References

External links

1943 births
20th-century American judges
American legal scholars
Drexel University alumni
Georgetown University Law Center faculty
Judges of the United States Court of Appeals for the D.C. Circuit
Living people
People from Gloucester Township, New Jersey
People from Palmyra, New Jersey
People from Riverside Township, New Jersey
United States court of appeals judges appointed by George H. W. Bush
University of Pennsylvania Law School alumni